Evans Henry Killeen (born February 27, 1936) is an American former professional baseball player. A right-handed pitcher, he worked in four Major League games, all in relief, for the Kansas City Athletics late in the  season.

Killeen was recalled from the Class A Albany Senators of the Eastern League in September 1959. In his four MLB relief appearances, he allowed four hits, four bases on balls, and three earned runs, with one strikeout, in 5⅔ innings pitched.

Killeen appeared in minor league baseball from 1955–62. In 184 minor league games, he won 55 and lost 61.

References

1936 births
Living people
Abilene Blue Sox players
Albany Senators players
American expatriate baseball players in Mexico
American expatriate baseball players in Panama
Sportspeople from Nassau County, New York
Charleston White Sox players
Columbia Gems players
Kansas City Athletics players
Major League Baseball pitchers
Mexican League baseball pitchers
Portsmouth-Norfolk Tides players
Quincy Jets players
Shreveport Sports players
Sportspeople from Brooklyn
Baseball players from New York City
Sultanes de Monterrey players
Syracuse Chiefs players
United States Marine Corps reservists
Welch Miners players
American people of Dutch descent
American people of Irish descent